Thalayana Manthram is a 1990 Indian Malayalam comedy-drama film directed by Sathyan Anthikkad and written by Sreenivasan. The film stars Sreenivasan, Urvashi, Jayaram, and Parvathy. Urvashi's performance as Kanchana received widespread acclaim and is considered one of the best in her career.

Plot
Sukumaran (Sreenivasan), his brother Mohanan (Jayaram) and their mother belong to a middle-class family and live happily. Sukumaran is a supervisor in a construction company named JK Constructions and Mohanan is a shopkeeper. Mohanan has recently married Shailaja (Parvathy Jayaram) who is a bank employee and is from a rich family unlike Sukumaran's wife Kanchana. Shylaja's fortunate life with money and job makes Kanchana envious of her and Kanchana slowly starts causing problems in the family by finding unnecessary issues which affects the smooth running of a peaceful family life. Finally Sukumaran leaves their family house and starts living in a rented house with Kanchana by Kanchana's request. The rented house is located in a posh colony wherein the residents are very rich.

Soon Kanchana finds that living in luxury is not conducive with the economic situation of Sukumaran who is just a supervisor in a company. To match their social status Kanchana lies to her new neighbours that her husband is an engineer in a construction company. Soon Sukumaran pushes for demands like buying expensive home appliances, arranging a dance master for their daughter and sending her to an English medium school, buying an old car (in which Sukumaran would meet with an accident thereby increasing their medical expenses and car repair charges) etc. The huge economical demands slowly crush Sukumaran and it finally affects him in the manner of creditors demanding their money back.

In order to meet their financial requirements Sukumaran finally decides to cheat his employer by forgery. The authorities soon come to know about the truth and one day, when Sukumaran is already under heavy economical pressures, the police arrive and arrest him. The next day, because of the ill reputation caused by the family the house owner drives Sukumaran's family out of their rented house. At this point Mohanan comes to their rescue knowing about the situations where his brother has been led by the ill advice of his wife Kanchana. Mohanan arranges money by selling his wife's gold ornaments and repays the creditors. Sukumaran is finally released from jail. In the end the family is re-united when Kanchana understands her mistakes.

Cast

Sreenivasan as Sukumaran 
Urvashi as Kanchana, Sukumaran's wife
Jayaram as Mohanan 
Parvathy as Shylaja, Mohanan's wife 
Innocent as T.G. Daniel 
K. P. A. C. Lalitha as mother of Sukumaran and Mohan
Mammukoya as Kunjananthan Mesthiri
Sukumari as Sulochana Thankappan
Philomina as Paruammayi
Meena as Jiji Daniel
Sankaradi as Thankappan
T. P. Madhavan as Manager
Oduvil Unnikrishnan as Pothuval Mash
Paravoor Bharathan as Damodharan Pillai
Jagadish as Bhasurachandran (Cameo) 
Kollam Thulasi as Dhamodharan Kartha (Cameo) 
Sindhu Manu Varma as Jojo Daniel

Soundtrack

Awards
 Kerala State Film Award for Best Actress - Urvashi

Box office
The film was a commercial success.

References

External links

1990s Malayalam-language films
Films with screenplays by Sreenivasan
Indian drama films
Films shot in Thiruvananthapuram
Films directed by Sathyan Anthikad
Films scored by Johnson
Indian comedy films
1990 comedy films
1990 films